China Agri-Industries Holdings Limited is a leading producer and supplier of processed agricultural products (including oilseed, wheat and rice) in Mainland China. Its service categories are biofuel and biochemical, oilseed processing, rice trading and processing, brewing materials, and wheat processing. Its chairman is Chi Jingtao.

It was split from COFCO International Limited (Now China Foods Limited) and listed in the Hong Kong Stock Exchange on 21 March 2007. Since 10 September 2007, it has been added to be a member of Hang Seng China-Affiliated Corporations Index Constitute Stock (Red chip).

Divisions
China Agri-Industries Holdings has five operating divisions with total revenues in 2010 of HK$53.49 billion and profit of HK$1.283 billion. In order of relative size, the divisions include oilseed processing, biofuels and biochemical, rice trading and processing, wheat processing and brewing materials. Oilseed processing comprised nearly two-thirds of total revenue for the first half of 2011. China Agri-Industries Holdings is China's leading fuel ethanol producer. Its facilities include the first and only non-grain-based fuel ethanol producer in China, using tapioca as raw material.

See also
Bioenergy in China

External links
Official website China
Official website Global

Companies listed on the Hong Kong Stock Exchange
Chinese companies established in 2006
Food and drink companies based in Beijing
Manufacturing companies based in Beijing
Government-owned companies of China
Companies in the Hang Seng China-Affiliated Corporations Index
COFCO Group
Chinese brands
Food and drink companies established in 2006